Kim Ji-sung (Hangul: 김지성, Hanja: 金智星; 7 November 1924 - 12 November 1982) was a South Korean football midfielder who played for the South Korean national team in the 1954 FIFA World Cup.

Honours

Player
ROK Army CIC
Korean National Championship: 1957, 1959
Korean President's Cup: 1956, 1957, 1959

South Korea
AFC Asian Cup: 1956
Asian Games silver medal: 1954, 1958

Individual
KASA Best Korean Footballer: 1958

Manager
	Yonsei University
Korean National Championship runner-up: 1974
Korean President's Cup runner-up: 1961, 1969

South Korea U20
 AFC Youth Championship runner-up: 1962

References

External links
FIFA profile

1924 births
South Korean footballers
South Korea international footballers
Association football midfielders
1954 FIFA World Cup players
1982 deaths
Asian Games medalists in football
Footballers at the 1954 Asian Games
Footballers at the 1958 Asian Games
AFC Asian Cup-winning players
1956 AFC Asian Cup players
Medalists at the 1954 Asian Games
Asian Games silver medalists for South Korea